Brampton Township is a civil township in Sargent County, North Dakota, United States.

Brampton Cemetery is outside city limits.

Of the Township's 66 residents, 61 are white, four are Native, and one is "two or more races".

References

External links
 City Data: Brampton Township, Sargent County, North Dakota

Townships in Sargent County, North Dakota
Townships in North Dakota